Antonia Isola (born May 16, 1876) is the pseudonym of Mabel Earl McGinnis, author of Simple Italian Cookery, the first Italian cookbook published in the U.S.

Biography
McGinnis was born May 16, 1876, in New York to John McGinnis and Lydia Olivia Matteson. She married Norvell Richardson.

She had lived in Rome for some years and was well-versed in Italian food, but publishers Harper & Brothers chose the pseudonym to impart the air of "authenticity" to the work. Simple Italian Cookery was published February 1912.

References

 Simple Italian Cookery, by Antonia Isola. Harper & Brothers 1912; Reprinted by Applewood Books for The Culinary Trust in 2005, introduction by Robert Brower,

External links
 
  (single book)
 

1876 births
Year of death missing
American cookbook writers
Women cookbook writers
American women non-fiction writers